The Nervures Altea (sometimes Altéa) is a French single-place paraglider that was designed by Xavier Demoury and produced by Nervures of Soulom. It is now out of production.

Design and development
The Altea was designed as an intermediate glider. The models are each named for their relative size.

A total of 390 were built during its production run of 2001–2005.

Variants
Altea S
Small-sized model for lighter pilots. The glider model is AFNOR Standard certified.
Altea M
Mid-sized model for medium-weight pilots. The glider model is AFNOR Standard certified.
Altea L
Large-sized model for heavier pilots. The glider model is AFNOR Standard certified.

Specifications (Altea M)

References

External links
Official website

Altea
Paragliders